Yang Ming may refer to:

Mat Yeung or Yang Ming (born 1981), Hong Kong television actor
Yang Ming (kickboxer), Chinese kickboxer
National Yang-Ming University, university in Taipei, Taiwan
Wang Yangming, Ming dynasty neo-Confucian and bureaucrat
Yang Ming Marine Transport Corporation, Taiwanese shipping company
Yangmingshan, national park in Taiwan